Don Odle (May 12, 1920 – March 7, 2002) was American football and basketball player and coach. He served as at the head football coach at Taylor University from 1948 to 1949 and as the school's men's basketball coach, amassing nearly 500 victories from 1948 to 1979.

References

External links
 Pro Basketball Encyclopedia profile

1920 births
2002 deaths
Taylor Trojans football coaches
Taylor Trojans football players
Taylor Trojans men's basketball coaches
Taylor Trojans men's basketball players
American men's basketball players